Ispoure is a commune in the Pyrénées-Atlantiques department in south-western France.

It is located in the former province of Lower Navarre and historically has a high percentage of inhabitants of Cascarot descent.

See also
Communes of the Pyrénées-Atlantiques department

References

External links

 

Communes of Pyrénées-Atlantiques
Lower Navarre
Romani communities in Europe
Romani in France
Pyrénées-Atlantiques communes articles needing translation from French Wikipedia